The X Games Foz de Iguaçu 2013 was an action sporting event which took place from April 18–21, 2013 in Foz do Iguaçu, Paraná, Brazil. Venues for the event included the Iguaçu National Park and Infraero Park.

It was the first Summer X Games held in 2013, before events in Barcelona, Spain (May 9–12); Munich, Germany (June 27–30); and Los Angeles, United States (August 1–4, 2013).

Event locations
Venue locations for each sport disciplines for X Games Foz de Iguaçu:

Iguaçu National Park
BMX Vert
Skateboard Vert

Infraero Park
BMX Dirt
BMX Park
BMX Big Air
Moto X Best Whip
Moto X Freestyle
Moto X Speed & Style
Moto X Step Up
Moto X Enduro X
Skateboard Big Air
Skateboard Park
Street League Skateboarding
Rally Cross

Results

Moto X

Skateboarding

BMX

Rallying

Medal table

References

External links
XGames.com

X Games
2013 in Brazilian sport
2013 in rallying
2013 in multi-sport events
Multi-sport events in Brazil
X Games
April 2013 sports events in South America